Henry Bean (born 1945) is an American filmmaker and actor.

Henry Bean may also refer to:

Henry J. Bean (1853–1941), American politician and judge
Henry Bean, killed in Bear River Massacre

See also
William Henry Bean (born 1843), Australian businessman and politician